Woopra  is a customer analytics service intended to assist organizations with developing marketing techniques.

Press
In 2009, Daniel Brusilovski from TechCrunch called Woopra an "impressive live tracking and analytics service". ReadWriteWeb named Woopra a top web product of 2010 and gave it an honorable mention in 2011. ReadWriteWeb's Founder, Richard MacManus, says Woopra is "without a doubt the most addictive business tool I use." In 2012, eWeek listed Woopra as a "hot web analytics" company and American Express OPEN Forum listed it as one of the "smartest web analytics tools". Business 2 Community, in 2012, cites Woopra's real time analytics as a useful adjunct to Google Analytics.

See also
 List of web analytics software

References

External links
 Woopra.com

Web log analysis software